Sulbutiamine (brand names Arcalion, Enerion) is a synthetic derivative of thiamine (vitamin B1). In France, it is used to treat symptoms of weakness or fatigue.  It is also sold as a dietary supplement.  Sulbutiamine was discovered in Japan as part of an effort to develop useful thiamine derivatives.

Medical use
Sulbutiamine is used to treat asthenia (symptoms of fatigue or weakness), though is not clear if it is effective in alleviating tiredness. It is also used to treat thiamine deficiency and poor concentration. Being a potent cholinergic anxiolytic, Sulbutiamine is a popular nootropic, with users reporting enhanced memory, focus and improved mood and motivation. Endurance athletes may use it to try to enhance their performance.

Adverse effects
Adverse effects in clinical trials have included diarrhea, bladder infections, bronchitis, arthritic pain, back pain, asthma, abdominal pain, insomnia, constipation, gastroenteritis, diffuse pain, sinusitis, headache, kidney pain, vertigo, and sore throat.

History

Efforts to develop thiamine derivatives with better bioavailability than thiamine were conducted in the 1950s, mainly in Japan.  These efforts led to the discovery of allicin (diallyl thiosulfinate) in garlic, which became a model for medicinal chemistry efforts to create other thiamine disulfides.  The results included sulbutiamine, fursultiamine (thiamine tetrahydrofurfuryl disulfide) and benfothiamine.  These compounds are hydrophobic, easily pass from the intestines to the bloodstream, and are reduced to thiamine by cysteine or glutathione.

It was first marketed in France by Servier in 1973 under the brand name Arcalion.  The drug registration went through a validation procedure in France in the 1980s, which found that the use for treatment of fatigue was not supported by data. In January 1989, 100 mg tablet doses were discontinued in favour of 200 mg tablets.

Research
Because thiamine deficiency causes problems with memory and other cognitive functions, thiamine and analogs like sulbutiamine have been studied in clinical trials in the 1980s and 1990s for age-associated cognitive decline.

Sulbutiamine has been explored in clinical trials as a potential treatment for chronic fatigue syndrome. Studies have also been undertaken to
assess its impact on reversing age-related changes in the circadian system.

The pharmacology of sulbutiamine has been studied in various mice and rats; as of 2014 it appeared that sulbutiamine might be more effective in raising thiamine phosphate levels in the brain than benfotiamine and fursultiamine, but this has not been fully verified. University of Oxford studies indicate that it helps prevent apoptotic cell death, caused by trophic factor deprivation, in retinal ganglion cells.

In an uncontrollled clinical trial, sulbutiamine was reported to be effective in reducing fatigue in patients with multiple sclerosis.

See also 
 Vitamin B1 analogue
 Pyritinol

References 

Aromatic amines
Formamides
Isobutyrate esters
Nootropics
Organic disulfides
Pyrimidines
Thiamine